The Centre for Higher Education (CHE) is a German organization dedicated to higher education reform. Founded in 1994 by the Bertelsmann Stiftung and the German Rectors' Conference as a non-profit limited liability company, it is best known to the public for its published university rankings.

CHE University Ranking 

Introduced in 1998, the annual CHE University Ranking is the most comprehensive ranking of German universities and Fachhochschulen.

Criticism 
CHE has been criticized for lobbying the media, politics and society to increase the acceptance of tuition fees and "elite" universities. The relationship between CHE and Bertelsmann is seen as particularly problematic. Since CHE is largely financed by the Bertelsmann Stiftung, which is the majority owner of Bertelsmann, critics doubt the sociopolitical neutrality and non-profit nature of the institution and assume that CHE's policies are significantly influenced by the interests and ideas of the media corporation.

References 

1994 establishments
Think tanks based in Germany